Nemo may refer to:

Arts, entertainment and media

Games
 Nemo (arcade game), a 1990 arcade game by Capcom based on Little Nemo
 NEMO (video game console), an unreleased console

Music
 Nemo (American band), an indie rock band
 Nemo (Belgian band), a former rock band
 Nemo (French band), a rock band
 "Nemo" (song), by Nightwish from their album Once
 "Nemo", a song by Umphrey's McGee from their album Safety in Numbers
 NEMO Music Showcase and Conference, a former annual music event in Boston, Massachusetts

Other uses in arts, entertainment and media

 Nemo (magazine), devoted to classic comic strips
 Nemo (1984 film), directed by Arnaud Sélignac
 Network for the Establishment and Maintenance of Order, a fictional DC Comics organization created by the extraterrestrial Controllers

Companies and organizations
 Saint Lucia National Emergency Management Organisation
 Nemo 33, a diving center in Uccle, Belgium
 NEMO Equipment, Inc., a manufacturer of outdoor tents and shelters
 Nemo Rangers GAA, an Irish athletic club
 Paul Morris Motorsport, also known as Nemo Racing, a defunct Australian motor racing team (1999–2012)

Science and technology

Biology and medicine
 IKBKG or NF-Kappa-B essential modulator (NEMO), a protein
 NEMO deficiency syndrome

Physics and computing
 Nemo (file manager), a file manager for Linux distributions forked from Nautilus
 NEMO, an Australian open source electricity system model
 NEMO (Stellar Dynamics Toolbox), a toolbox for stellar dynamics modeling
 Neutrino Ettore Majorana Observatory, a neutrino-related experiment in Modane, France
 Nucleus for European Modelling of the Ocean, a computational model of ocean circulation
 Nemo Mobile, a Linux mobile system originally based on Mer.

Vehicles
 Citroën Nemo, a small truck
 Sisu Nemo, a motor
 Nemo, a remotely controlled underwater vehicle operated by Tommy Gregory Thompson
 DSV-5 Nemo, a submersible used by the United States Navy between 1970 and 1986 to oversee and observe undersea construction work.

Other uses in science and technology
 NEMO (museum), a national science museum in Amsterdam
 Nemo link, a submarine power cable between the United Kingdom and Belgium, operational since January, 2019.
 Caisson Nemo, a former French rocket launch pad off the Riviera coast
 NeMO, a NASA project for the Next Mars Orbiter

People, pets and fictional characters
 Nemo (name), people, fictional characters and a dog with the surname or given name
 Constantin de Grimm, illustrator of Vanity Fair caricatures under the name "Nemo"

Places

Antarctica
 Nemo Cove, Pourquoi Pas Island, Graham Land
 Nemo Glacier, Pourquoi Pas Island, Graham Land
 Nemo Peak (Antarctica), Wiencke Island, Palmer Archipelago

United States
 Nemo, Missouri, an unincorporated community
 Nemo, South Dakota, an unincorporated community
 Nemo, Texas, an unincorporated community

Elsewhere
 1640 Nemo, an asteroid
 Mount Nemo (British Columbia), in the Selkirk Mountains 
 Mount Nemo, a crag in Mount Nemo Conservation Area, Ontario, Canada
 Point Nemo, the place in the ocean that is farthest from land
 Nemo Peak, a volcano in the Kuril Islands

Other uses
 German submarine U-505, a World War II submarine captured by the US and temporarily renamed USS Nemo
 Patria NEMO, a mortar system
 February 2013 nor'easter, also known as "Winter Storm Nemo"
 Nemo, the theoretical fourth part of the human psyche that emphasizes the self's insignificance and meaninglessness, used in The Aristos by John Fowles
 Nemo A534, a German Shepherd dog who served in the US Air Force during the Vietnam War
 Nearly but not fully Missing Out, a variant of fear of missing out

See also
 NEEMO (NASA Extreme Environment Mission Operations), a program studying human survival in an underwater laboratory
 Outis, the Greek equivalent